Cannock railway station serves the town of Cannock in the Cannock Chase, Staffordshire, England. It is situated on the Chase Line. The station and all trains serving it are operated by West Midlands Trains. The station is located over half a mile from the centre of the town, close to the suburbs of Stoney Lea and Hawks Green.

History
In 1854, the South Staffordshire Railway (SSR) obtained powers to build a branch to Cannock from Ryecroft Junction on its main line near Walsall; this was opened to passengers and goods on 1 February 1858 together with Cannock station. In 1855, the Cannock Mineral Railway (CMR) was authorised to connect this branch with the London and North Western Railway (LNWR) at Rugeley, this line was leased to the LNWR on 7 November 1859 and opened for passengers and goods at the same time. The SSR was leased to the LNWR in February 1861 and absorbed on 15 June 1867; the CMR being absorbed by the LNWR in 1869. The station was closed by British Railways on 18 January 1965.

The station reopened by British Rail in 1989, as part of the first stage of the reopening to passenger trains of the Chase Line from Walsall to Hednesford.  It had previously closed to passengers on 18 January 1965 and to goods on 10 August 1964, as part of the Beeching Axe. The remains of a small part of the original Up (southbound) platform can still be seen just to the north of the station and behind platform 1.

Announcements were made in December 2018 for minor renovations of the station. "The plans include extending the platform, improving access, creating a 300-space car park, adding spaces for bikes and improving information points. The total cost is expected to be £400,000, with £129,000 being contributed from the joint Investment Fund agreed by Staffordshire County Council and £40,000 from the West Midlands Rail Executive and West Midlands Trains."

Completion of electrification of the Chase line in May 2019 enabled an increased service frequency and speed of services from Cannock including a direct electric train service to London for the first time.

Services
Service frequencies vary depending on the time of day. Of the two southbound services per hour, one continues to London Euston and the other to Birmingham International. All northbound services terminate at Rugeley Trent Valley, apart from two services per day which terminate at Hednesford. There are two trains per hour throughout the day on Saturdays with an hourly evening service. 
On Sundays there are hourly southbound services to Coventry.

Gallery

References

External links

Railway stations in Staffordshire
DfT Category F1 stations
Former London and North Western Railway stations
Railway stations in Great Britain opened in 1858
Railway stations in Great Britain closed in 1965
Railway stations in Great Britain opened in 1989
Railway stations served by West Midlands Trains
Beeching closures in England
1858 establishments in England
Reopened railway stations in Great Britain
Railway station